Krisztián Grecsó (born 18 May 1976) is a Hungarian writer, poet and editor.

Biography
Grecsó was born in Szegvár on 18 May 1976. His younger brother, is a dancer and choreographer. In 2001, he received a diploma in Hungarian language and literature from the Attila József University in Szeged.

Between 2001 and 2006, Grecsó worked as an editor for the  literary journal in Békéscsaba. From 2007 to 2009, he was a lead editor of the Nők Lapja women's magazine. In 2009, he became the lead editor of the prose and essay section of Élet és Irodalom.

In 2001, he achieved widespread fame with his short story collection Pletykaanyu ("Gossip Mom"). This was followed by a number of successful novels: Isten hozott ("Welcome", 2005),  Tánciskola ("Dance School", 2008), Mellettem elférsz ("There's Room for You Beside Me", 2011), Megyek utánad ("I Follow You", 2014), Jelmezbál ("Costume Ball", 2016) and Vera (2019).

He wrote the book of the highly successful musical , based on Ferenc Molnár's novel The Paul Street Boys, which premiered in the Comedy Theatre of Budapest on 5 November 2016.

Personal life
He is married to Judit Árvai, a press relations associate of the Magvető publishing house. In 2019, they adopted a girl, Hanna. In October 2018, Grecsó was diagnosed with HPV-associated head and neck cancer. He recovered in early 2019.

Works
 Angyalkacsinálás (1999; poetry)
 Pletykaanyu (2001; short stories)
 Isten hozott (2005; novel)
 Tánciskola (2008; novel)
 Mellettem elférsz (2011; novel)
 Megyek utánad (2014; novel)
 Jelmezbál: Egy családregény mozaikjai (2016; novel)
 Harminc év napsütés (2017; short stories)
 Vera (2019; novel)
 Magamról többet (2020; poetry)
 Belefér egy pici szívbe (2020; children's poetry)
 Valami népi (2022; short stories)

Awards and honours
  (1999)
 Sándor Bródy Prize (2002)
  (2002)
  (2002)
  (2004)
 Attila József Prize (2006)
  (2012)

References

Hungarian male novelists
Hungarian male poets
21st-century Hungarian novelists
21st-century Hungarian male writers
Attila József Prize recipients
1976 births
Living people